Nomophila noctuella, the rush veneer,  is a species of moth of the family Crambidae.

Distribution
This species has a nearly cosmopolitan distribution (Europe, North Africa, Central Asia, Pakistan, North America). In Europe, it is a migratory species, travelling from southern Europe and North Africa to Northern Europe.

Description

The wingspan is 26–32 mm. Forewings are very elongated and narrow. The basic color of the forewings is usually brown, with darker wide eight-shaped  and reniform markings in the discal and postdiscal areas. Some dark brown spots are present close to the outer edge and to the apex. The hindwings are whitish with brown veins.

The mature larvae are gray green and spotted.

Biology
These moths fly from May to September depending on the location. They are attracted to light, and in Europe they are migratory. There are two to four generations per year.

The larvae feed on Trifolium, clover, Medicago, Polygonum aviculare, wheat, Vaccinium and various other grasses. They pupate in a cocoon amongst the leaves of the host plants or on a stone. The pupa hibernates.

References

External links
 
 Observato.org
 Lepinet 

Spilomelinae
Moths described in 1775
Moths of Europe
Moths of the Comoros
Moths of Africa
Moths of Iceland
Moths of Japan
Moths of Madagascar
Moths of Mauritius
Moths of Réunion
Moths of Seychelles
Moths of Asia
Moths of the Middle East
Taxa named by Michael Denis
Taxa named by Ignaz Schiffermüller